Borikhane (Bolikanh) is a district (muang) of Bolikhamsai province in central Laos. Its administrative center is Borikham town.

References

Districts of Bolikhamsai province